Jeff Nesset (born September 13, 1952) is an American businessman and former politician from Idaho. Nesset was a Republican member of Idaho House of Representatives and former mayor of Lewiston, Idaho.

Early life 
On September 13, 1952, Nesset was born in Culbertson, Montana.

Education
Nesset earned a Bachelors degree in Business Management from Montana State University.

Career 
In 1981, Nesset joined D.A. Davidson. Nesset is a certified financial advisor and Senior Vice President with D.A. Davidson in Lewiston, Idaho.

In 1996, Nesset joined the city council of Lewiston, Idaho. In 1998, Nesset became the mayor of Lewiston, Idaho.

On November 2, 2010, Nesset won the election and became a member of Idaho House of Representatives for District 7, seat A. Nesset defeated Liz Chavez with 54.6% of the votes.

On May 15, 2012, Nesset ran for a redistricted District 6 open senate seat unsuccessfully during the Republican Primary. Nesset was defeated by Dan G. Johnson with 59.6% of the votes.

Awards 
 Bragg Lewis Knutson Community Service Award.
 2019 Ian B. Davidson Cultural Excellence Award.

Personal life 
Nesset's wife is Teri Nesset. They have three children.

References

External links
 Jeff Nesset at ballotpedia.org
 2010 May 25, Primary Election Results
 Financial information (state office) at the National Institute for Money in State Politics

1952 births
Living people
Mayors of places in Idaho
Republican Party members of the Idaho House of Representatives
Montana State University alumni
People from Lewiston, Idaho
People from Roosevelt County, Montana